Two ships of the Royal Navy have borne the name HMS Camilla:

  was a 20-gun sixth rate launched in 1776, used for harbour service from 1814 and sold in 1831.
  was a 16-gun sloop launched in 1847. She was lost in a typhoon in 1860.

Royal Navy ship names